The 2014–15 ABA League was the 14th season of the ABA League, with 14 teams from Serbia, Slovenia, Montenegro, Croatia, Bosnia and Herzegovina, Macedonia, Hungary and Bulgaria participating in it.

Regular season started on October 3, 2014, and lasted until March 22, 2015 followed by playoffs of the four best placed teams.

Team information

Head coaches

Coaching changes

Regular season
The regular season began on October 3, 2014, and ended on March 22, 2015.

Standings

Schedule and results

Playoffs

Semifinals
The semifinals will be played in April 2015. Teams 1 & 2 will host Games 1 and 2, plus Game 5 if it is necessary. Teams 3 & 4 will host Game 3, plus Game 4 if it is necessary.

Game 1

Game 2

Game 3

Game 4

Game 5

Finals

Game 1

Game 2

Game 3

Game 4

Attendances

Average home attendances

Stats leaders

MVP Round by Round

MVP of the Month

Ranking MVP

Points

Rebounds

Assists

The ideal five and coach of the season
The ideal five of the season were selected by fans and head coaches of the ABA League teams, with both contributing 50% of the final result for every playing position.

ABA League clubs in European competitions

References

External links
 Official website
 ABA League at Eurobasket.com

2014–15
2014–15 in European basketball leagues
2014–15 in Serbian basketball
2014–15 in Slovenian basketball
2014–15 in Croatian basketball
2014–15 in Bosnia and Herzegovina basketball
2014–15 in Montenegrin basketball
2014–15 in Hungarian basketball
2014–15 in Republic of Macedonia basketball
2014–15 in Bulgarian basketball